The  is the standard issue general-purpose machine gun of the Japan Self-Defense Forces, known as the Type 62 GPMG. When first issued it fulfilled both light and medium machine gun support throughout the JGSDF. Though the Sumitomo Heavy Industries' M249 firing the smaller 5.56×45mm NATO cartridge has largely replaced it in the light machine gun role at the squad level in the JGSDF, the Type 62 still plays the support role at platoon and company level for the infantry as a medium machine gun firing the more powerful 7.62×51mm NATO cartridge. It also continues to be used as a co-axial weapon in various armored vehicles, including tanks and APCs. Like all modern Japanese-made firearms, it was never exported.

History
After years of using the Browning M1919A4 as its standard GPMG during the early days of founding the Japan Self-Defense Forces, Sumitomo Heavy Industries had manufactured the NTK-62 GPMG, designed at Nittoku Metal Industry (NTK) by Masaya Kawamura's team. The GPMG was made to meet the requirements of the Japanese Defense Agency. The designation "62" was present due to the fact that first batches of the NTK-62 were made in 1962 after development started in 1954. It was specifically adopted on February 15, 1962, effectively replacing the M1919 Browning machine gun in JGSDF service.

Overview
The Sumitomo NTK-62 is a gas operated machine gun chambered in the 7.62×51mm NATO cartridge, belt fed with the use of M13 disintegrating links. It has an unusual feed tray as the pivoting lever is above the bolt in the receiver, rather than in the feed tray cover found on most machine guns.

Variants

Type 74
The  is a fixed mount variant for  AFV use, including the Type 74,  Type 90 and Type 10 MBTs, Mitsubishi Type 89 IFV and the Komatsu Type 87 Reconnaissance Vehicle.

It weighs 20.4 kg (45.0 lb), unlike the Type 62 which weighs 10.15 kg (22.4 lb).

References

External links

 Official J.G.S.D.F Page
 NTK-62 Prototypes
 NTK-62 sight
 NTK-62 images

7.62×51mm NATO machine guns
Weapons and ammunition introduced in 1962
Infantry weapons of the Cold War
General-purpose machine guns
Japan Self-Defense Forces
Machine guns of Japan
Cold War weapons of Japan
Sumitomo Heavy Industries